Mirian (Georgian: მირიან) is a Georgian masculine given name that may refer to
Mirian I of Iberia, king of Iberia (Kartli, eastern Georgia) 
Mirian II of Iberia (c. 90–20 BC), king of Iberia (Kartli, eastern Georgia) 
Mirian III of Iberia, king of Iberia (Kartli, eastern Georgia) 
Mirian of Kakheti, Georgian prince reigning between 736 and 741 
Prince Mirian of Georgia (1767–1834), Georgian prince

Mirian Curletti, Argentine politician 
Mirian Giorgadze (born 1976), Georgian wrestler 
Mirian Modebadze (born 1997), Georgian rugby union player 
Mirian Shvelidze (born 1947), Georgian artist
Mirian Silva de Paixão (born 1982), Brazilian football player
Mirian Tsalkalamanidze (1927–2000), Georgian wrestler 

Georgian masculine given names